Stigmella speciosa is a moth of the family Nepticulidae. It is found from Denmark to the Iberian Peninsula, Italy and Greece, and from Great Britain to the Ukraine.

Adults are on wing from May to August.

The larvae feed on Acer monspessulanum, Acer obtusatum, Acer opalus, Acer pseudoplatanus and Acer sempervirens, mining the leaves of their host plant. The mine consists of a full depth corridor which is variable in length and width.

References

External links
 

Nepticulidae
Leaf miners
Moths described in 1857
Moths of Europe
Taxa named by Heinrich Frey